Ryan Luka Cordeiro de Souza (born 30 April 2003), known as Ryan Luka, is a Brazilian footballer who plays as a forward for Flamengo.

Club career
Born in Além Paraíba, Minas Gerais, Ryan Luka joined Flamengo's youth setup in 2016, aged 12. He made his first team – and Série A – debut on 13 June 2021, coming on as a late substitute for fellow youth graduate Rodrigo Muniz in a 2–0 home win against América Mineiro.

Career statistics

References

2003 births
Living people
Sportspeople from Minas Gerais
Brazilian footballers
Association football forwards
Campeonato Brasileiro Série A players
CR Flamengo footballers